District scolaire 03 (or School District 03) is a Canadian school district in New Brunswick.

District 03 is a Francophone district operating 21 public schools (gr. K-12) in Carleton, Victoria, Madawaska and Restigouche counties.

Current enrollment is approximately 7,000 students and 470 teachers. District 03 is headquartered in Edmundston.

List of schools

High schools
 Polyvalente A.-J.-Savoie
 Cité des Jeunes A.-M.-Sormany
 École Marie-Gaétane
 École Mgr-Matthieu-Mazerolle
 Polyvalente Thomas-Albert

Elementary schools
 École Marie-Immaculée
 École Mgr-Martin
 Mgr-Lang
 Élémentaire Sacré-Coeur
 Régionale-de-Saint-André

Combined elementary and middle schools
 Carrefour de la Jeunesse
 Centre d'apprentissage du Haut-Madawaska
 École Echo Jeunesse
 École Ernest-Lang
 École Notre-Dame
 Régionale Saint-Basile
 École Sainte-Anne (Sainte-Anne-de-Madawaska)
 École Saint-Jacques
 École Saint-Joseph

Other schools
 Classe alternative (Cité des Jeunes)
 Classe alternative (Polyvalente Thomas-Albert)
 École Grande-Rivière

External links
 Official Website

Former school districts in New Brunswick